Ice Hockey is an ice hockey video game designed by Alan Miller for the Atari VCS (later renamed the Atari 2600), and published by Activision in 1981. Actor and comedian Phil Hartman starred in the commercial for the game.

Gameplay

Ice Hockey is a game of two-on-two ice hockey. One player on each team is the goalie, and the other plays offensive (although, the goalie is not confined to the goal). As in the real sport, the object of the game is to take control of the puck and shoot it into the opposing goal to score points. When the puck is in player control, it moves left and right along the blade of the hockey stick. The puck can be shot at any of 32 angles, depending on the position of the puck when it's shot.

Human players take control of the skater in control of (or closest to) the puck. The puck can be stolen from its holder; shots can also be blocked by the blade of the hockey stick.

Reception
Ice Hockey was favorably reviewed in 1982 by Video magazine where it was described as "yet another example of Activision's innovative approach to programmable video-game software" and suggested that along with Championship Soccer the game "proves that cleverly conceived sports simulations can work on the Atari VCS". Reviewers identified several aspects setting Ice Hockey apart from other contemporary sports games including the ability of players to take actions that would normally result in penalties (e.g. tripping and slashing), and the fact that the game is playable in both solo and versus modes.

Richard A. Edwards reviewed Ice Hockey in The Space Gamer No. 54. Edwards commented that "It's a good game overall, but not a great treatment of ice hockey.  Due to the frustrations which can occur and the confusion involved in using two team members, this game straddles the fence on deciding about recommendation.  Due to the price, it might be better left alone."

When Bill Kunkel reviewed the Atari 8-bit computer game Hockey by Gamma Software, he wrote, "Gamma's version misses the level of realism attained in Activision's programmable version for the VCS, by quite a bit."

See also

List of Atari 2600 games
List of Activision games: 1980–1999

References

External links
Ice Hockey at AtariAge
Ice Hockey at AtariMania

1981 video games
Activision games
Atari 2600 games
Atari 2600-only games
Ice hockey video games
Video games developed in the United States